Ragni is an Italian surname that translates to "spiders" in English. Notable people with the name include:

 Elio Ragni (1910–1998), Italian athlete
 Gerome Ragni (1935–1991), American actor, singer and songwriter
 Ottavio Ragni (1852–1919), Italian general
 Riccardo Ragni (born 1991), Italian football goalkeeper
 Ragni Piene (born 1947), Norwegian mathematician

Italian-language surnames